The 2014 Eneco Tour was the tenth running of the Eneco Tour cycling stage race. It started on 11 August in Terneuzen and ended on 17 August in Sittard-Geleen, after seven stages. It was the 21st race of the 2014 UCI World Tour season.

Teams
All 18 teams in the UCI's Proteam category were entitled, and obliged, to enter the race. Two UCI Professional Continental teams were also invited.

†

†

†: Invited Pro-Continental teams

Schedule
The race consisted of seven stages, including one individual time trial stage. Just as the previous season, the race finished with a stage including the Muur van Geraardsbergen, which was famous for its presence in the Tour of Flanders single-day race.

Stages

Stage 1
11 August 2014 — Terneuzen (Netherlands) to Terneuzen,

Stage 2
12 August 2014 — Waalwijk (Netherlands) to Vlijmen (Netherlands),

Stage 3
13 August 2014 — Breda (Netherlands) to Breda, individual time trial (ITT)

Stage 4
14 August 2014 — Koksijde (Belgium) to Ardooie (Belgium),

Stage 5
15 August 2014 — Geraardsbergen (Belgium) to Geraardsbergen,

Stage 6
16 August 2014 — Heerlen (Netherlands) to Aywaille (Belgium),

Stage 7
17 August 2014 — Riemst (Belgium) to Sittard-Geleen (Netherlands), 

Niki Terpstra was disqualified for aggressive behaviour during this stage towards Maarten Wynants.

Classification leadership table

UCI World Tour points
The 2014 Eneco Tour was part of the UCI World Tour and so the riders could earn UCI World Tour points. Below is states which riders won points and where. For each stage, points were given to the top five in each stage: 6, 4, 2, 1 and 1. At the end of the tour, the top 10 in the standings receive points as follows: 100, 80, 70, 60, 50, 40, 30, 20, 10 and 4. This resulted in the following points being earned during this tour:

References

External links

Benelux Tour
Eneco Tour
Eneco Tour
Eneco Tour
Cycling in Sittard-Geleen
Cycling in Zeeland
Sport in Terneuzen